The Interpretation Act 1889 (52 & 53 Vict c 63) was an Act of the Parliament of the United Kingdom.

In Northern Ireland, Section 48(2) of the Interpretation Act (Northern Ireland) 1954 provided that without prejudice to 48(1) of that Act, the Interpretation Act 1889 was to cease to apply to the interpretation of enactments. The whole Act, except paragraphs (4), (5) and (14) of section 13 in their application to Northern Ireland, was repealed by section 25(1) of, and Schedule 3 to, the Interpretation Act 1978.

In the Republic of Ireland, the application of the Interpretation Act 1889 was restricted to pre-1924 legislation by the Interpretation Act 1923, and repealed by the Interpretation Act 2005.

Construction of references

Without prejudice to section 17(2)(a) of the Interpretation Act 1978, a reference to the Interpretation Act 1889 or to any provision of that Act, whether occurring in another Act, in subordinate legislation, in Northern Ireland legislation or in any deed or other instrument or document, must be construed as referring to the Interpretation Act 1978, or to the corresponding provision of the Interpretation Act 1978, as it applies to Acts passed at the time of the reference.

Application to Church Assembly Measures

The Interpretation Act 1889, except section 5 thereof (which related to the meaning of "parish") applied to the Interpretation Measure 1925, and to all Measures passed by the Church Assembly after that Measure, in like manner as it applied to an Act of Parliament, and as if that Measure and those Measures were Acts of Parliament.

Section 5
This section was repealed by section 69(1) of, and Schedule 8 to, the Rating and Valuation Act 1925, as to England and Wales, except as to the administrative county of London and Isles of Scilly (ss. 70(1) and (2)).

This section was repealed as to the Isles of Scilly by the Isles of Scilly Order 1927 (SR & O 1927/59), p. 1500.

Section 13
This section was amended for Ireland by sections 38 to 43, 46, 47 and 49 of, and schedule 7 to, the Government of Ireland Act 1920.

In this section, paragraphs (4), (5) and (14) as they applied to Northern Ireland were repealed by section 122(2) of, and Part I of Schedule 7 to, the Judicature (Northern Ireland) Act 1978.

Section 15
Section 15(3) was repealed by section 80(7) of, and Schedule 13 to, the Representation of the People Act 1948 (11 & 12 Geo 6 c 65).

In section 15(4), the words from "and" onwards were repealed by section 80(7) of, and Schedule 13 to, the Representation of the People Act 1948.

Section 17
In section 17(1) the words "or members" were repealed by section 80(7) of, and Schedule 13 to, the Representation of the People Act 1948.

Sections 17(2) and (3) were repealed by section 80(7) of, and Schedule 13 to, the Representation of the People Act 1948.

Section 18
Section 18(3) was restricted by section 11 of the Statute of Westminster 1931 which provided that notwithstanding anything in the Interpretation Act 1889, the expression "Colony" did not, in any Act of the Parliament of the United Kingdom passed after the commencement of the Statute of Westminster 1931, include a Dominion or any Province or State forming part of a Dominion. A Dominion for the purposes of the Act meant only those Dominions described in section 1, being the Dominion of Canada, the Commonwealth of Australia, the Dominion of New Zealand, the Union of South Africa, the Irish Free State and Newfoundland.

In section 18(3), the words "and of British Burma" were repealed by section 5(3) of, and part I of Schedule 2 to, the Burma Independence Act 1947.

Sections 18(4) and (5) were omitted by the Government of India (Adaptation of Acts of Parliament) Order 1937 (SR & O 1937/230), p. 965.

In section 18(6), the words "outside British India" were inserted by the Government of India (Adaptation of Acts of Parliament) Order 1937 (SR & O 1937/230), p. 965.

Section 18A
This section was inserted by the Government of India (Adaptation of Acts of Parliament) Order 1937 (SR & O 1937/230), p. 965.

So much of section 18A as provided that the expression "Governor-General", in relation to the period between the commencement of Part III of the Government of India Act 1935, and the establishment of the Federation of India, meant the Governor-General in Council, did not apply to section 6 of the Indian and Colonial Divorce Jurisdiction Act 1940.

In section 18A(2), the words "or the Government of Burma Act, 1935" were repealed by section 5(3) of, and part I of Schedule 2 to, the Burma Independence Act 1947.

Section 22
In the Republic of Ireland, this section was disapplied by section 2(3) of the Exchequer and Local Financial Years Act 1974

Section 38
Section 38 of the Interpretation Act 1889 had the same effect in relation to any repeal by the Judicature (Northern Ireland) Act 1978 of a statutory provision other than an Act of the Parliament of the United Kingdom as it had in relation to the repeal by the Judicature (Northern Ireland) Act 1978 of such an Act.

Section 41
This section was repealed by section 1 of, and the Schedule to, the Statute Law Revision Act 1908.

Schedule
The Schedule was repealed by section 1 of, and the Schedule to, the Statute Law Revision Act 1908.

See also
Interpretation Act

References
Halsbury's Statutes,
The Statutes Revised. Third Edition. His Majesty's Stationery Office. 1950. Volume XI. Pages xxvii and 585 to 598.
The Law Commission and the Scottish Law Commission. Interpretation Bill: Report by the Law Commission and the Scottish Law Commission on the Interpretation Act 1889 and Certain Other Enactments relating to the Construction and Operation of Acts of Parliament and Other Instruments. Law Com 90. SLC 53. Cmnd 7235. June 1978.
The Public General Acts passed in the Fifty-second and Fifty-third Years of the Reign of Her Majesty Queen Victoria. Printed for Her Majesty's Stationery Office by the Queen's Printer. London. Pages 329 to 341.

External links
Text of the act as originally enacted
List of amendments and repeals in the Republic of Ireland from the Irish Statute Book

United Kingdom Acts of Parliament 1889